

History

Background 
Before 1989, the Constitution of the Islamic Republic of Iran provided that head of government was the Prime Minister, nominated by the President and approved by the Parliament. The Islamic Republican Party (IRP) which together with its Khomeinist allies had seized power and ousted all opponents, held an uncontested and single-party presidential election in October 1981 and got its candidate Ali Khamenei elected. The party also held the majority in the parliament.

Formation
President Ali Khamenei who belonged to the right-wing faction of the IRP, was willing to nominate his like-minded as the head of government.

Reshuffles
In Summer 1983 two pro-market ministers, Asgaroladi and Tavakoli, left the cabinet following months of disagreements behind the scenes.
On 5 August 1984, Mousavi got a vote of confidence again and proposes a list of ministers to the parliament. Ten days later they were vetted, resulting to rejection of five.

Cabinet members

References 

1981 establishments in Iran
1985 disestablishments in Iran
Iran
Iran
Mousavi